''All Thats eighth season ran from September 21, 2002, to July 26, 2003 and is the second season of the relaunch era. This season contained 15 episodes plus a special episode looking for a new cast member.

The show saw many changes before the start of the season. Since season 7 was more of an experiment season, producers knew what worked and what didn't work with the show. Pickle Boy was taken out and only shown on rare occasions, and a formal green room was introduced. Like the first six seasons, the cast would start the show in the green room before starting the show. The intro was the same as the previous season, but with Spears edited in.

The entire cast from last season returned for their second on the show. Producers added Jamie Lynn Spears (credited as "Jamie Spears"), the younger sister of pop singer Britney Spears, to the cast,  due to her interest in being on the show. Claims of nepotism arose from this, and ironically, Britney Spears would show up and host and perform in this season.

This would be the final season for Bryan Hearne. Hearne wished to leave the show so he could focus on his music career.

This is also the first season when the cast began to perform Snick On-Air Dare. After the season ended, producers wanted to switch things up when looking for new cast members for the following season. Producers got Nickelodeon to hold a contest called: "R U All That?: Nickelodeon's Search for the Funniest Kid in America" to find the new cast member.

CastRepertory players'''
 Chelsea Brummet
 Jack DeSena
 Lisa Foiles
 Bryan Hearne
 Shane Lyons
 Giovonnie Samuels
 Jamie Spears
 Kyle Sullivan

Episodes

Special

References

External links
 TV.com's All That Season 8

2002 American television seasons
2003 American television seasons
All That seasons